Wange is a historic Swahili settlement in Kenya's Lamu County.

See also
Historic Swahili Settlements
Swahili architecture

References 

Swahili people
Swahili city-states
Swahili culture
Populated places in Coast Province
Lamu County